Andasta is a genus of ray spiders that was first described by Eugène Louis Simon in 1895.

Species
 it contains four species, found in Asia and on the Seychelles:
Andasta benoiti (Roberts, 1978) – Seychelles
Andasta cyclosina Simon, 1901 – Malaysia
Andasta semiargentea Simon, 1895 (type) – Sri Lanka
Andasta siltte Saaristo, 1996 – Seychelles (Silhouette Island)

See also
 List of Theridiosomatidae species

References

Further reading

Araneomorphae genera
Spiders of Africa
Spiders of Asia
Theridiosomatidae